Roccati is an Italian surname. Notable people with the surname include:

Cristina Roccati (1732–1797), Italian physicist and poet
Francesco Roccati (1908–1969), Italian long-distance runner
Marco Roccati (born 1975), Italian footballer

Italian-language surnames